White2 is the fourth album by Sunn O))). It was recorded during the same sessions as White1, but it was not released until a year later.

This album features Attila Csihar of Mayhem fame quoting the Srimad Bhagavatam on "Decay2 [Nihils' Maw]". The vinyl also features him on "Decay [The Symptoms of Kali Yuga]". "HELL-O)))-WEEN" is a more traditional Sunn O))) track, harkening back to The Grimmrobe Demos in its all-guitar-and-bass approach. A DOD Buzz Box effects pedal designed to imitate the sound of Buzz Osborne of The Melvins was used for the bass effects on "bassAliens".

The cover art is a drawing by Pieter Bruegel the Elder called The Bee-Keepers.

Track listing

Session musicians
Attila Csihar – vocals
Joe Preston
Rex Ritter
Dawn Smithson

See also
White1
WHITEbox

2004 albums
Sunn O))) albums
Southern Lord Records albums